László Barsi may refer to:

 László Barsi (runner) (1904–1975), Hungarian sprinter
 László Barsi (weightlifter) (born 1962), Hungarian weightlifter